Nathan Isaac Burton (born April 29, 1980) is an American football coach who is the secondary coach for the New Orleans Breakers of the United States Football League (USFL). He previously was the co-defensive coordinator and safeties coach at Georgia Tech.

Playing career 
Burton was a walk-on at Georgia Tech and played safety for the Yellow Jackets from 2001 to 2004.

Coaching career

Early coaching career 
After his playing career concluded, Burton stayed at Georgia Tech as a graduate assistant, a role he held for four seasons. He was also a graduate assistant at Oklahoma State for one season before moving on to UT Martin as their linebackers/defensive backs coach. Burton also had stints as a defensive coordinator at both Shorter and West Alabama before spending 2017 at NC State as a quality control assistant.

Temple 
Burton was named the defensive backs coach at Temple in 2018, reuniting him with Owls head coach Geoff Collins, who was an assistant at Georgia Tech when Burton was a player.

Georgia Tech 
After Collins was named head coach at Georgia Tech in 2019, Burton was named the co-defensive coordinator and safeties coach for the Yellow Jackets. His contract was not renewed after the 2021 season.

New Orleans Breakers
In 2022 he coached the secondary for the New Orleans Breakers of the USFL.

References

External links 
 
 Georgia Tech profile

1980 births
Living people
Players of American football from Georgia (U.S. state)
Coaches of American football from Georgia (U.S. state)
American football safeties
Georgia Tech Yellow Jackets football players
Georgia Tech Yellow Jackets football coaches
Oklahoma State Cowboys football coaches
UT Martin Skyhawks football coaches
Shorter Hawks football coaches
West Alabama Tigers football coaches
NC State Wolfpack football coaches
Temple Owls football coaches
New Orleans Breakers (2022) coaches